The Lordship of Carrara was an Italian feudal state centered in Carrara, in what is now northern Tuscany.

When emperor Henry VII suppressed the bishopric of Luni, once the main fief in the area, he assigned the territory of the former free commune of Carrara to his ally the Republic of Pisa in 1313. The lordship of Carrara was subsequently held by different families and at different cities, such as Lucca and the Visconti of Milan, and was finally sold to the marquis of Massa in 1473. Massa and Carrara were from then on ruled together, in a sort of personal union, until their merging into the Duchy of Modena and Reggio in 1836, being elevated over the centuries first into a principality and a marquisate respectively, then into a duchy and a principality.

Italian city-states
Carrara
Duchy of Massa and Carrara
History of Tuscany